Sclerolobium denudatum is a species of legume in the family Fabaceae.
It is found only in Brazil.

References 

Caesalpinioideae
Flora of Brazil
Near threatened plants
Taxonomy articles created by Polbot
Taxobox binomials not recognized by IUCN